Cassandra Louise Trotter (née Parry; born 16 June 1966) is a fictional character from the British sitcom Only Fools and Horses. She is portrayed by Gwyneth Strong.

Biography
The intelligent, slightly spoiled daughter of the owner of a successful printing business, Alan (Denis Lill) and his wife Pam (Wanda Ventham), Cassandra was an ambitious employee of the local bank. She made her first Only Fools and Horses appearance in the episode Yuppy Love, in which she attended the same adult education class as Rodney. The two first met when Rodney accidentally took her raincoat from the cloakroom, thinking it was his. They met again at a disco later that evening, at which Rodney's friends Mickey Pearce and Jevon unsuccessfully asked her for a dance. Rodney then bet £20 that he would be successful and, to their horror, she agreed to dance with him. Cassandra also offered to give him a lift home, and they exchanged telephone numbers. However, as he was ashamed to take her home to Nelson Mandela House, he pretended he lived in a more upmarket location on King's Avenue and was duly left stranded as it began to pour with rain. Again he took the wrong coat, getting drenched as he walked home.

Originally John Sullivan wanted to make Cassandra a girlfriend of Trigger, Denzil or an admirer of Boycie, but decided that, like Del, Rodney needed a long-term relationship.

Their relationship blossomed throughout the sixth series; In The Unlucky Winner Is..., Cassandra went to Spain with Rodney and Del, and had to pretend to be Del's wife and Rodney's stepmother. In Sickness and Wealth, Rodney announced that they were engaged; they married in the final episode of series 6, Little Problems, after which they moved into their own flat. Her marriage to Rodney was not without its problems; Rodney envied Cassandra's privileged upbringing and her qualifications. When Cassandra wanted to build herself a career at the bank, Rodney was outraged, as he wanted her to be little more than a housewife, and have his dinner on the table for when he got home from work.

After a year of marriage, Cassandra and Rodney split up in The Jolly Boys Outing (the 1989 Christmas special), when he punched her boss in a fit of misplaced jealousy, breaking his nose. In the next episode to be aired, Rodney Come Home, (Christmas special 1990), they broke up again. This split carried on throughout series 7. In The Chance of a Lunchtime, Del helped reunite them. However, the two were only together for an hour before Cassandra saw Rodney with an ex-fiancée of Del Boy. Assuming that Rodney was cheating on her, Cassandra locked him out of the flat. They were ultimately reconciled in Three Men, a Woman and a Baby, but after just getting back together they were interrupted by a phone call to say Raquel, Del Boy's partner, had gone into labour and Del wanted Rodney to be there for the birth. The episode Miami Twice saw them trying to patch up their relationship, and in Mother Natures Son they were back together permanently. The later episodes saw them attempting to conceive a child, and Cassandra was promoted to head of small business investment at the local bank. After suffering a miscarriage in "Modern Men", she and Rodney later had a daughter, Joan (named after Del and Rodney's late mother), in Sleepless in Peckham.

Family tree

References

Bibliography

Only Fools and Horses characters
Television characters introduced in 1989
Fictional English people
British female characters in television